The Latin Grammy Award for Best Instrumental Album is an honor presented annually at the Latin Grammy Awards, a ceremony that recognizes excellence and creates a wider awareness of cultural diversity and contributions of Latin recording artists in the United States and internationally. The award goes to the artists for releasing albums containing at least 51% or more of instrumental tracks of Latin instrumental recordings.

The award was first presented in 2001 in the pop field under the name of Best Pop Instrumental Album when it was handed out to Nestor Torres for the album This Side Of Paradise. However it wasn't until the Latin Grammy Awards of 2004 when the instrumental field was created and the award received its current denomination Best Instrumental Album which was awarded to Yo-Yo Ma for Obrigado Brazil.

Chick Corea is the biggest winner in this category with two awards. Furthermore, musicians from the United States have received this award on four occasions. The rest of the winners come from Argentina, Cuba, Colombia and Puerto Rico. In 2013, the album Presente by Bajofondo became the first instrumental album to be nominated for Album of the Year.

History

At the first Latin Grammy Awards ceremony a category intended for instrumental recordings was presented in the pop field under the name of Best Pop Instrumental Performance for singles and tracks only. The winner was Mexican guitarist Santana for the song "El Farol", which also happened to win the Grammy Award for Best Pop Instrumental Performance that same year, who competed against; Raul di Blasio for "El Despertar Escandalo", Ivan Lins for "Dois Córregos", Frankie Marcos featuring Arturo Sandoval for "Oh Havana, When I Think Of You" and Nestor Torres for "Luna Latina". The following year a category was created under the name of Best Pop Instrumental Album now intended for full albums. In 2004 the category was renamed Best Instrumental Album and moved to the newly created instrumental field which now includes all forms of Latin instrumental music.

Winners and nominees

2000s

2010s

2020s

 Each year is linked to the article about the Latin Grammy Awards held that year.

References

General
  Note: User must select the "Instrumental Field" category as the genre under the search feature.

Specific

External links
Official site of the Latin Grammy Awards

 
Instrumental Album